Clonopsis gallica, the French stick insect, is a stick insect species in the genus Clonopsis.  It has been recorded from: Croatia, France (including Corsica), Jersey, Italy (including Sicily, Sardinia and most of the minor islands) Portugal (including Azores), Spain (including Majorca), Madeira, Tenerife and North-Western Africa.

This species is a stable, obligate parthenogen.

References

External links 
 

Phasmatodea
Phasmatodea of Europe
Insects described in 1825
Taxa named by Toussaint de Charpentier